Subtiaba is an extinct Oto-Manguean language which was spoken on the Pacific slope of Nicaragua, especially in the Subtiaba district of León. Edward Sapir established a connection between Subtiaba and Tlapanec. When Lehmann wrote about it in 1909 it was already very endangered or moribund.

Lexical comparison 
Lexical comparison from Native American Language Net:

See also 
Tlapanecan languages

References

 Campbell, Lyle (1979): "Middle American Languages" en The languages of native America: Historical and comparative assessment, Campbell, Lyle; & Mithun, Marianne (Eds.), Austin: University of Texas Press, pp. 902–999.

External links 
Subtiaba, at Summer Institute of Linguistics
OLAC resources in and about the Subtiaba language

Languages of Nicaragua
Mesoamerican languages
Oto-Manguean languages
Extinct languages of North America
Languages extinct in the 20th century